The Two Girls (French: Les deux gamines) is a 1921 French silent film serial directed by Louis Feuillade and starring Sandra Milovanoff, Olinda Mano, and Violette Jyl. Based on a melodramatic novel, it was remade twice in 1936 and 1951.

The film's sets were designed by the art director Robert-Jules Garnier.

Cast
 Sandra Milovanoff as Ginette  
 Olinda Mano as Gaby  
 Violette Jyl as Lisette Fleury, leur mère 
 Alice Tissot as Flora Bènazer  
 Gaston Michel as Le grand-pére Bertal  
 Fernand Herrmann as Pierre Mannin, le pére  
 Lugane as Mlle. de Bersanges  
 Édouard Mathé as M. de Bersanges  
 Henri-Amédée Charpentier as Bénazer, le fripier  
 Georges Martel as Maugars, complice de Bénazer  
 Jeanne Rollette as Joséphine, la servante  
 Blanche Montel as Blanche  
 René Poyen as René  
 Laure Mouret as Sephora Bénazer  
 Madame Gordenko as Soeur Véronique

References

Bibliography
 James L. Limbacher. Haven't I seen you somewhere before?: Remakes, sequels, and series in motion pictures and television, 1896-1978. Pierian Press, 1979.

External links 
 

Film serials
1921 films
French drama films
French silent feature films
1921 drama films
1920s French-language films
Films directed by Louis Feuillade
Films set in France
Gaumont Film Company films
French black-and-white films
Silent drama films
1920s French films